Stefan Brogren (born 21 April 1972) is a Canadian actor, director, and producer. He is best known as Archie "Snake" Simpson in the Degrassi franchise of television shows.

Early life
Stefan Brogren was born on 21 April 1972, in Toronto, Ontario, Canada. Brogren's father is of Swedish descent.

Career
Brogren has portrayed Archie "Snake" Simpson since his teen years, as a student in Degrassi Junior High and Degrassi High in the late 1980s and the early 1990s, and then as a media teacher and principal in Degrassi: The Next Generation (2001-2015). He is the only actor to appear in every season of the Degrassi franchise, and is also a regular cast member in each season. Brogren was the first Canadian actor to use the word "fuck" on Canadian primetime television, on the Degrassi High TV movie, School's Out! when he was discussing Joey Jeremiah's sexual escapades with Tessa Campanelli.

In 1999, Brogren starred in the music video for "Rock Past It" by London pop-metal band Scratching Post.

Brogren made his directing debut with Degrassi of the Dead, a non-canonical horror episode, which aired on Halloween 2007. The 15 minute webisode depicted several Degrassi characters attempting to escape from other characters who had become zombies as a result of eating genetically modified food. The show was followed by a behind-the-scenes/making-of presentation during which he was introduced as the director. He has directed many episodes since, and became a series producer in the eleventh season.

Brogren is one of two directors of The L.A. Complex which, like Degrassi, was produced by Epitome Pictures.

Personal life
He resides in Toronto, Ontario, Canada. He is 6 feet 4 inches (6'4") tall, and is married to Canadian comedian and actress Michelle Shaughnessy.

Filmography

Awards

References

External links

1972 births
Living people
20th-century Canadian male actors
21st-century Canadian male actors
Canadian male film actors
Canadian male screenwriters
Canadian male television actors
Canadian people of Swedish descent
Canadian Screen Award winners
Canadian television directors
Canadian television producers
Male actors from Toronto